The Redemptorists officially named the Congregation of the Most Holy Redeemer, abbreviated CSsR, is a Catholic clerical religious congregation of pontifical right for men (priests and brothers). It was founded by Alphonsus Liguori at Scala, Italy, for the purpose of labouring among the neglected country people around Naples. It is dedicated to missionary work and they minister in more than 100 countries. Members of the congregation are Catholic priests and consecrated religious brothers.

The Redemptorists are especially dedicated to Our Lady of Perpetual Help and were appointed by Pope Pius IX in 1865 as both custodians and missionaries of the icon of that title, which is enshrined at the Redemptorist Church of St. Alphonsus Liguori in Rome. Many Redemptorist churches are dedicated to her under that title.

However, the Patroness of the Congregation is the Blessed Virgin Mary under the title "Immaculate Conception," of which St. Alphonsus was the strong propogater even before Marian Dogma was officially promulgated.

Foundation and development

Alphonsus Liguori was deeply moved by the plight of the poor living in Naples and the surrounding area and established his community with the aim of providing spiritual nourishment. Amongst his companions was Gerard Majella. In 1748 Alphonsus petitioned Pope Benedict XIV, to allow him to establish a congregation to minister to the poor in the area around Naples. Benedict agreed and the congregation was formed in November 9, 1732.

Within ten years of its foundation, communities had been established at Nocera, Ciorani, Iliceto, and Caposele. Due to political complications, there was an initial difficulty with the houses in the Papal States being separated from those in the Kingdom of Naples, but this was overcome in 1793 and the congregation soon opened houses in Sicily and other parts of southern Italy.

The congregation was soon to move beyond the borders of present-day Italy. In 1785, two Austrians, Clemens Maria Hofbauer and Thaddeus Hübl, joined the Redemptorists. In 1786 Hofbauer and Hübl went to Warsaw, Poland where the papal nuncio gave them responsibility for the parish of Saint Benno in the New Town; their mission thrived until the community was expelled in 1808. In 1793, Hofbauer turned his sights on establishing communities in Germanic lands. Soon houses were opened in the south at Jestetten, Triberg im Schwarzwald, and Babenhausen. In 1818, a house was established in Switzerland at the abandoned Carthusian monastery in La Valsainte.

19th century
In 1826, at the request of the government of Austria, the Redemptorists established a community in Lisbon, Portugal, with the purpose of ministering to German speaking Catholics. Other houses quickly followed in German-speaking areas: Mautern an der Donau (1827), Innsbruck (1828), Marburg (1833), Eggenburg (1833), and Leoben (1834).

The congregation also rapidly expanded into Belgium with communities at Tournai (1831), Sint-Truiden (1833), Liège (1833), and Brussels (1849). A community was even established in the Netherlands, at the time somewhat anti-Catholic, when a house was opened in Wittem in 1836. The revolutions of 1848 which swept over Europe caused much upheaval, and the Redemptorists were expelled from Switzerland and Austria and were at risk elsewhere.

The congregation thrived throughout the remainder of the 19th century; in 1852 there were four provinces, and by 1890 this had increased to twelve with communities having been established in Chile, Colombia, Ecuador, England, Scotland, Spain, and Suriname. The 20th century saw the continuation of expansion to where the congregation created new provinces, vice provinces, and missions in every decade, and established a network of lay associates and volunteers who work with the Redemptorists to bring the Gospel to the poor.

Apostolate
Redemptorists are essentially a missionary society although their ministry is not confined to developing nations. According to their rule they are "to strive to imitate the virtues and examples of Jesus Christ, our Redeemer consecrating themselves especially to the preaching of the word of God to the poor". Their labors consist principally in missions, retreats, and similar exercises. In 2019, there were approximately 5,500 Redemptorists in 82 countries throughout the world.

Preaching and parochial missions
Alphonsus Liguori wanted his companions to be itinerant preachers of the Word of God. Traditionally, this has been the mainstay of the Redemptorists as they are well known for conducting parochial missions. The purpose of these parochial missions and the homilies preached by the Redemptorists is to "... invite people to a deeper love for God and a fuller practice of the Christian life." In accordance with the instructions of Liguori, preaching is to be down-to-earth and understandable to all who are listening.

Shrines, sanctuaries and retreat houses
In order to advance their mission and provide places of pilgrimage, the Redemptorists administer several shrines, which draw hundreds of thousands of people, the best-known being in Brazil, Canada, Colombia, the Philippines, Rome, and Singapore. The congregation operates many retreat houses where people of all walks of life, Catholic or otherwise, can spend some time in reflection, either individually or in a group.

Redemptorists are caretakers of the Byzantine icon of Our Mother of Perpetual Help, depicting the Virgin Mary with the Child Jesus and the instruments of the Passion. The icon was entrusted to them by Pope Pius IX. It is now enshrined in the Redemptorist Church of St. Alphonsus Liguori, Rome, and Redemptorists propagate devotion to Mary under this title.

Other ministry
As with most religious congregations, the Redemptorists are also involved in other forms of ministry such as parishes, education, youth and social communication. In recent years the congregation has increasingly become concerned with matters of social justice; as the Generalate website states "Redemptorists believe that the saving love of God touches the whole person and calls for the transformation of social injustice into respect for the dignity of all men and women". The Redemptorist religious province of Cebu in the Philippines have made a specific commitment in this regard: "Moved by the poverty and dehumanised condition of our people, and encouraged by their faith and desire for justice ... We, the Redemptorists of the Province of Cebu, as an apostolic community dedicated through our vows, are called to respond to the urgent needs of our people, especially the most abandoned and the poor ..."

Religious formation
After an initial period of contact and discernment, the person seeking to enter the Redemptorists becomes a "candidate" and goes to live in one of the communities so that both sides might become better acquainted. This lasts about two years during which they learn about Redemptorist prayer, life, and ministry.

Assuming that all goes well, the candidate then begins the novitiate, lasting a year. The novitiate year is crucial, for it is then "... that the novices better understand their divine vocation, and indeed one which is proper to the institute, experience the manner of living of the institute, and form their mind and heart in its spirit, and so that their intention and suitability are tested." Thus, the novices are given the opportunity for longer periods of prayer and spiritual reading as well as silence in order to reflect on the vocation God is offering and nature of their response. The spiritual development of the novice is of particular focus, especially through spiritual direction. During the novitiate the history and constitutions of the congregation are studied in depth.

A simple profession is made at the end of the novitiate, and the person officially becomes a member of the Redemptorists for "By religious profession, members assume the observance of the three evangelical counsels by public vow, are consecrated to God through the ministry of the Church, and are incorporated into the institute with the rights and duties defined by law."  At this point it is normal to begin studying philosophy and theology at university level. During this time there is ample opportunity to experience a variety of ministries in which the Redemptorists are engaged, both in the member's home country and internationally. Temporary vows are renewed annually.

At the end of this period of formation, which lasts for a minimum of three years perpetual profession (final vows) is made and ordination to the diaconate and presbyterate follows for those called to holy orders (i.e. to become a priest).

As the academic programs come to an end, all Redemptorists in temporary vows are required to participate in a pastoral experience for a minimum of six months to a year, outside of a brother's home province.

Religious vows

As members of a religious congregation, Redemptorists embrace the evangelical counsels, taking the three traditional religious vows of poverty, chastity and obedience. Poverty means that all possessions are held in common and that no member may accumulate wealth. Chastity means more than abstaining from sexual activity and its purpose is to make the religious totally available for service; it is also a sign that only God can completely fill the human heart. For a member of a religious congregation, obedience is not slavishly doing what one is told by the superior but being attentive to God's will by prayerfully listening to the voice of the person in charge. For the Redemptorist, the three vows challenge those values presented as being important by modern-day society. Recognising that the living out of the three traditional vows can be truly challenging, each Redemptorist takes a fourth vow and oath, that of perseverance.

Organization
The Generalate is in Rome. The most fundamental unit of the Redemptorists is the local community in which members live together, combining their prayers, experiences, successes and failures, as well as any possessions for the service of the Gospel. Each community has a local superior who is chosen to exercise the ministry of leadership and the service of authority for the common good. The superior is assisted by a vicar and a group of advisors.

Local communities are organized into larger groups: Missions, regions, vice-provinces, provinces. A province is led by a provincial and his council, composed of elected members. In terms of governance, the members of each province elect representatives who gather in a Provincial Chapter. Vice-provinces usually look to a founding province to provide support in terms of personnel and finances until it is able to become self-sufficient. Otherwise, it enjoys the freedom and authority necessary to adjust matters to the particular needs of its mission. Regions and Missions are normally communities established in new missionary areas and they depend on the founding province or vice-province.

The Superior General convokes the General Chapter every six years. The General Chapter is the primary governing and representative body of the Redemptorists, carefully examining the mission of the congregation in accordance with the spirit of Alphonsus Liguori and its traditions. The day-to-day international affairs of the congregation are handled by the General Council, which is composed of a superior general and six consultors. The General Council is both a directive and executive body.

Regions and provinces
 South Europe: 6 provinces and 2 regions
 North Europe: 8 provinces, 2 vice-provinces, 2 regions and 1 mission,
 North American Redemptorists are divided into five provinces (Baltimore, Denver, Edmonton-Toronto, Yorkton for the Ukrainian Greek Catholics, and Mexico) and two vice-provinces (Richmond and the Extra-Patriam, for the Vietnamese Catholics). North America: 5 provinces, 2 vice-provinces and 4 regions.
 Latin America: 13 provinces, 11 vice-provinces, 4 regions and 2 missions.
 Africa:  1 province, 5 vice-provinces, 2 regions and 5 missions.
 Asia-Oceania:	6 provinces, 5 vice-provinces, 4 regions and 2 missions.

Regional development

Africa
In 1899 the Belgian fathers were requested by their government to take charge of a number of missions in the Congo State, at that time a Belgian colony: Kinkanda, Kionzo, Kimpese, Matadi, Sonagongo and Lake Tumba.

In 1987 the Denver Province established a mission in Nigeria which was so fruitful that it soon became a vice-province. The members of the vice-province have made concerted efforts to involve the laity in their work. The Redemptorists also minister in Angola (1967); Burkina Faso; Ghana; Ivory Coast (1993); Madagascar (1967); Niger; Zimbabwe (established by the British Redemptorists in 1960 and revitalized in 1989)

In 1990 the Indian Redemptorists began a mission in Kenya where there are several professed members.

In South Africa Redemptorists administer parishes in Cape Town, Rustenburg and Howick. There is also a convent of Redemptoristines sisters in Merrivale, KwaZulu-Natal. For the Redemptorists of Southern Africa "... Justice and Peace is part and parcel of everything we are and do. In the South African context ... we are called by the poor to a simple life-style and we cannot avoid the struggle of the outcasts and oppressed of the townships and the desperate plight of the poor."

In May 2011 a number of allegations of child sexual abuse by a member of the institute in South Africa were revealed on the RTÉ programme Prime Time Investigates.

Alan Shatter, the Minister for Justice and Equality, stated:

Australia and New Zealand

The first house established was in Singleton, New South Wales, but during the summer heat missions were conducted in the cooler climate of New Zealand's dioceses. As Singleton was an unsuitable base, the community oversaw the building of a new monastery at Mount St Alphonsus, Waratah, New South Wales. It was opened on the founder's feast, 1887, just five years after the Redemptorists' arrival. In the first year at Waratah the community conducted 45 missions through New South Wales, Victoria and South Australia. A new house in Ballarat followed in 1888 and work began on a new monastery in the suburb of Wendouree. It was officially opened in September 1893.

With the south now being cared for by the Ballarat community, those in Waratah looked north to Queensland and the first missions were preached there in 1889. Missions began in Brisbane and its surrounds, with their success convincing the Archbishop to extend the programme to the far flung country parishes.

The first structure that was purpose-built for the Redemptorists in New Zealand was St Gerard's Church in Wellington in 1908.

In 1927, the Province of Australasia, which included Australia and New Zealand, was created. New Zealand became an independent province in 1970 and from New Zealand, the Redemptorists went to Samoa in 1972.

The years after World War II were a time of rapid expansion. As well as ongoing participation in the development of the vice-provinces in the Philippines and in Singapore and Malaysia, further houses were opened in New Town in Tasmania and Townsville and Miami in Queensland. There were also communities established in New South Wales: Campbell's Hill, Concord, Fairfield West, Penrith and Yagoona. In Victoria, there were communities at Balwyn, Box Hill, Brighton, Wongarra and Yarraville. In Melbourne, the order also conducted a psychotherapy clinic and Training Institute, Hofbauer Centre, from 1977 until 1998.

Missionary activity continues to flourish across Australia. Through parochial missions, preaching, retreats, adult education, teaching in universities, social justice work, counselling, accompaniment of indigenous communities, chaplaincies, devotions to Our Lady of Perpetual Help, working with people on the margins of society and promoting the family through the Majellan magazine, Redemptorists have sought to highlight that people matter greatly to God. For the Australian Redemptorists, the issue of social justice "... matters to the Redemptorists for it is at the core of our mission in the world."

India
Three Irish Redemptorists Mathew Hickey, Gerard McDonell and Leo O'Halloran from the Province of Dublin with great zeal and missionary dynamism set on a task to proclaim the Good News and arrived in the Island country of Sri Lanka in the year 1938. The long cherished dream of the Redemptorists to establish a foundation in India was actualized in the year 1940 when the first community was established in Bangalore in 1940.

It was Hugo Kerr, the Provincial Superior of the Province of Dublin who obtained permission from Monsignor Despartures, the Bishop of Mysore to establish a foundation in Bangalore. In the Lent of 1941 St. Gerard's House at John Armstrong Road became the First Permanent residence of the Redemptorists. On 1 October 1945 the Indian Redemptorist mission became a Vice-Province and Mathew Hickey was the first Vice-Provincial. And the next ten years (from 1945 to 1955) saw great structural developments with Mt. St. Alphonsus (MSA) being built which would be the permanent house of the Studentate (7 June 1951) and the much awaited Holy Ghost Parish was opened for public worship on 24 May 1953. It was during this time St. Alphonsus School with the help of Sisters of St. Joseph of Tarbes, began in the Students’ wing of MSA. The school was later moved to Davis Road which stands till today catering to the education of the poor children who come from the vicinity of the area. In July 1964 Sadupadesa College on Hennur Road was built to house students who would study philosophy. It is now turned into a Juvenate which is the first stage of formation (as of 2015). In July, 2010 Holy Redeemer Parish was erected in Sadupadesa.

The Vice-Province of Bangalore grew steadily facing all odds and overcoming all obstacles to become the Province of Bangalore on 15 August 1972 and also took a momentous initiative in the year 1990 by establishing a Redemptorist community in Kenya, Africa. Now the mission has 7 indigenous priests along with the members of the province serving in the mission. The Province of Bangalore has also given birth to two other units, the Liguori Province of Kerala and the Vice-province of Majella along the western coast of India.

As of 2011 there were some 260 Redemptorists in India, belonging to two Provinces, one Vice-Province, one Region and one Mission. The Region of Alwaye was established in 1992 and became a Province (Province of Liguori) in 2008. The Region of Mumbai was established in 1999 and was raised to the status of a Vice-Province in 2011. The Mission of Kenya began in 1990 and there are several perpetually professed Kenyan members.

The Philippines
The first Redemptorists, belonging to the Irish province, arrived in Opon, Cebu, on 30 June 1906, setting up missions in Compostela, San Francisco and on the Camotes Islands. From 1914 to 1928 further communities were established, the most prominent being: Luzon (where the Redemptorists preached the first mission completely in Tagalog), Lipa, Iloilo, Tacloban and Cagayan de Oro on Mindanao.

In 1928, the Philippines was divided into two vice provinces, each under a different province—the Cebu vice-province responsible for the Visayas and Mindanao under the Irish province; and the Manila vice-province responsible for Luzon under the Australian province, now headquartered at the National Shrine of Our Mother of Perpetual Help in Baclaran.

The Second Vatican Council (1962–1965) had a profound impact on the Redemptorist Congregation and this resulted in them pledging themselves more strongly to the poor and disadvantaged in imitation of Alphonsus Liguori. When the political and social upheavals came in the 1960s and 1970s the Filipino Redemptorists stood in solidarity with those seeking justice and equality for they were to "... embrace the mission to proclaim by word and action, the Gospel of justice so that the poor's aspirations can be fully realised in Christ, the source of liberation."

In 1996, the Cebu vice-province became an independent province, known as the Cebu Province.

United Kingdom and Irish provinces

Redemptorists arrived from Belgium in 1843, and the new province owed its great progress to Robert Aston Coffin, one of the band of converts associated with Cardinal John Henry Newman, Cardinal Henry Edward Manning, and William Faber in the Oxford Movement. Coffin was engaged in missions until he was appointed first provincial in 1865. During his administration new houses were founded in various parts of the United Kingdom, St Mary's Monastery at Perth being the first Scottish monastery opened since the Reformation. By 1910, the province had eight houses: Clapham in London, Bishop Eton in Liverpool, St Benet's Church, Monkwearmouth, Bishop's Stortford, Kingswood, Edmonton and a total membership of one hundred and twenty-three.

Today the Redemptorists of Britain are engaged in a variety of ministries: the mission amongst the poor of Zimbabwe, a renewal centre in Kinnoull, Perth where people can spend time in prayer and reflection as well as parishes in Birmingham, Bishop Eton in Liverpool and London. Their goal is "to defend our joy in Jesus Christ and to bring to others Plentiful Redemption"

In 1898 the houses in Ireland were constituted a separate province with the provincial house at Limerick. On 25 March 1901, the foundation of the juvenate house at Limerick was laid. The province of Ireland then comprised four houses: Limerick, Dundalk, Belfast, and Esker. In 1904, Fr. John Creagh orchestrated the antisemitic "Limerick pogrom" by giving two antisemitic sermons that invoked the blood libel, blamed Jews for the crucifixion of Jesus Christ, and called for a de facto boycott; under Fr. Creagh's watch, a number of Jews were violently beaten, and the majority of the Jewish population was driven out of Limerick after two years of near-total economic boycott. Today, the provincial house is located in Dublin with other communities being found in Belfast (Clonard Monastery and the parish of Saint Gerard), Cork, Dundalk, Athenry in Galway, Limerick and four houses are established. The Irish Redemporists are involved in parish ministry, youth work, Redemptorist publications and retreats. They also help staff the missions in Cebu in the Philippines Fr. Alec Reid CSsR, of Clonard Monastery, were instrumental in cross community initiatives, and helped facilitate the Irish Peace Process. Fr. Reid also helped promote talks for peace in the Basque country.

North American Province

United States

In 1828 Monsignor Résé, Vicar-General of Cincinnati, visited Europe in search of priests. While at Vienna he secured three priests and three lay brothers; they arrived in New York on 20 June 1832 and began working amongst the people of northern Michigan.  In 1839 they were called to Pittsburgh to assume charge of the German congregation and from this time the care of German congregations became a prominent element of the Redemptorists in North America.

The US province was erected in 1850 and one of the first tasks was the establishment of a seminary and the selection of a suitable place for a novitiate. Cumberland in Maryland, was chosen for the seminary and Baltimore for the novitiate. In 1868 the students were transferred to the new house of studies at Ilchester, Maryland and in 1907 the faculty and the students moved to Esopus, New York, on the Hudson River where a more spacious building had been erected.

In 1882, the congregation sent priests to the Archdiocese of Washington and eventually established five parishes. In 1861 they opened a community in Chicago, Illinois. Soon after, due to the many successful missions they had given in the Archdiocese of St. Louis a house was opened at St. Louis.  In 1871 an important mission house was opened at Roxbury, Boston and was dedicated to Our Lady of Perpetual Help. When, in 1883, a new parish was formed, the fathers of the mission church took charge. (In 2009, its later basilica, of the same name, hosted the nationally televised funeral of Massachusetts Senator Edward Kennedy, attended by President Barack Obama, three former US presidents and first ladies, among other dignitaries.)

From 1883 onward, the Redemptorists spread throughout most of North America and are present in a variety of states such as California in the west, Michigan and Illinois in the midwest, Washington, DC, and Baltimore in the northeast and Louisiana, Mississippi and Texas in the south.
 
North American Redemptorists are involved in giving parochial missions, social justice, retreats, youth ministry, ministry to adults with special needs, bioethics, publication of religious materials and chaplaincy work as well as outreach to the Hispanic community, ministry amongst the poor, and helping to staff missions in the Caribbean The Denver Province owns Liguori Publications, which publishes books and Liguorian magazine.

Canada and Caribbean
In 1874 the Redemptorists were called to St. Patrick's Church, Montreal, Quebec, Canada, the only church in that city for English-speaking Catholics. In 1878 they became the custodians of the shrine of Ste-Anne de Beaupré, near Quebec and then of St. Anne's, Montreal, a large parish in a very poor district of the city. Two other foundations were quickly established in Canada: Saint Patrick's, Toronto and Saint Peter's, New Brunswick in 1881 and 1884 respectively.

Canada was made a vice-province in 1894, where four more houses were opened. This province was initially dependent on the Belgian province. The West Indies were made a vice-province in 1904. There is also a house at Mayagüez in Puerto Rico. Spanish Redemptorists settled at San Juan. A parish comprising some 30,000 souls is confided to their care. On 26 July 1911, the Belgian houses of Canada were erected into a new province.

On 12 August 2014 a court in Quebec approved a settlement by which the Redemptorists will pay $20 million in compensation to people who had been sexually assaulted by members of the order while school students in their care.

The Yorkton Province is an Eastern church branch of the worldwide Congregation of the Most Holy Redeemer, serving the Ukrainian Greek Catholic Church in North America and is based in Saskatchewan and Manitoba, Canada.

Famous Redemptorists
 Alphonsus Liguori (1696–1787) founder, bishop and Doctor of the Church
 Gerard Majella (1726–1755) Religious
 Clement Hofbauer (1751–1888) patron saint of Vienna and Warsaw
 John Neumann (1811–1860) Bishop of Philadelphia, Pennsylvania, US
 Peter Donders (1809–1887) missionary to lepers in Batavia, Suriname
 Kaspar Stanggassinger (1871–1899) priest
 Gennaro Maria Sarnelli (1702–1744) priest
 Nicholas Charnetsky (1884–1959) bishop and martyr
 Vasyl Velychkovsky (1903–1973) bishop and martyr
 Zynoviy Kovalyk (1903–1941) priest and martyr
 Dominick Trcka (1886–1954) priest and martyr
 Ivan Ziatyk (1899–1952) priest and martyr
 Francis Xavier Seelos (1819–1867) priest
 Bernard Łubieński (1846-1933) priest
 Alfred Pampalon (1867–1896) priest
 Pelágio Sauter (1878-1961) priest
 Antonio Maria Losito (1838-1917) priest
 Willem Marinus van Rossum (1854–1932) Cardinal Prefect of the Congregation for the Evangelization of the Peoples
 Varkey Vithayathil (1927–2011) Major Archbishop of Ernakulam-Angamaly for Syro-Malabars (India)
 Julio Terrazas Sandoval (1936-2015) Archbishop of Santa Cruz de la Sierra (Bolivia) 
 Joseph William Tobin (born 1952) former Superior General (1997–2009), Secretary of Congregation for Institutes of Consecrated Life and Societies of Apostolic Life, former Archbishop of Indianapolis, Archbishop of Newark
 William Hickley Gross (1837–1898) Archbishop of Oregon City, Oregon, US
 Patrick Clune (1864–1935) first Archbishop of Perth, Australia
 Hugh MacDonald, (1841–1898) Bishop of Aberdeen
 Willem Duynstee, priest, jurist, moralist, and professor, Netherlands
 Aloysius Joseph Willinger (1886–1973) Bishop of Monterey-Fresno, California, US
 William Tibertus McCarty (1889–1972) Bishop of Rapid City, South Dakota, US
 Ralph Heskett (born 1953) Bishop of Gibraltar
 Ireneo Amantillo (1934–2018) Bishop of Tandag
 Emmanuel Cabajar (born 1942) Bishop of Pagadian
 Charles Fehrenbach (1909–2006) author of the book Mary Day by Day
 Bernard Häring (1912–1998), priest and influential theologian at the Second Vatican Council
Francis Connell (1888–1967), priest, theologian, and advisor at the Second Vatican Council
 Tadeusz Rydzyk (born 1945) founder and head of the Radio Maryja Family.
 Alec Reid (1931–2013), facilitator in the Northern Ireland peace process
 John Creagh (1870–1947) priest who delivered anti-Semitic sermons in Limerick in 1904.
 Joseph Owens (1908–2005)
 Liam Pilkington (1894–1977)
 Seán McManus (born 1944)
 Leo James English (1907–1997) compiler and editor of an English-Tagalog dictionary (1965) and a Tagalog-English dictionary (1986)
 Joe Maier (born 1939) co-founder of the HDF Mercy Centre in Bangkok.
 Raymond Brennan (1932–2003) founder of the Father Ray Foundation in Pattaya, Thailand
 Teofilo Vinteres (1932-2001) liturgical composer and former rector of the Baclaran Church.
 Amado Picardal- CBCP-BEC Executive Secretary, web blogger and "biking priest"
 Marreddy Vatti (1956-2015).
 Marcel Van (1928–1959), Servant of God, Vietnamese lay brother.
 Tony Flannery, Irish religious writer and dissident
 Michael Müller  author of devotional books
 Clement Campos. Well known moral theologian in India.
 Joseph Ivel Mendenha (India)

Educational institutions (partial list)
Schools
Our Lady of Perpetual Succour High School (Mumbai, India)
St Alphonsus School, Bangalore, India
Ruamrudee International School (Bangkok, Thailand)
Saint Alphonsus Catholic School (Cebu, Philippines) – now under the Benedictine Sisters

Tertiary and other
Alphonsian Academy
Holy Redeemer College of The Catholic University of America
St. Mary's College, Brockville (Toronto, Canada) — closed

See also

Radio Maryja is a radio station owned and run by the congregation
The teen magazine, Face Up
Sons of the Most Holy Redeemer, formerly the Transalpine Redemptorists
Feast of the Most Holy Redeemer

Notes

References

External links

Pope John Paul II. "Address to the Members of the Congregation of the Most Holy Redeemer", December 15, 1997
Pope John Paul II. "Address to the Congregation of the Most Holy Redeemer", October 3, 2003
 Congregation of the Most Holy Redeemer in ODIS - Online Database for Intermediary Structures 
 Congregation of the Most Holy Redeemer (Redemptorists) in ODIS - Online Database for Intermediary Structures 
 Archives of Redemptorists (Cssr) - North Belgian Province in ODIS - Online Database for Intermediary Structures 
 Image Archive of Redemptorists (Cssr) - North Belgian Province - 1834-2010 in ODIS - Online Database for Intermediary Structures

Redemptorists
1732 establishments in Italy
Catholic missionary orders
Institutes of consecrated life